Žarko Grbović (Cyrillic: Жарко Грбовић, born 20 May 1995) is a Montenegrin football player who plays for Montenegrin club FK Iskra Danilovgrad as a winger.

Club career
Born in Nikšić, Grbović made his professional debut with Mogren in the Montenegrin First League in 2011. In January 2014, he was loaned to Dutch side FC Twente at the age of 18, where he was deployed in the youth team. Over the course of the 2014-15 season, he scored a total of 8 goals over 24 games played at the age of 20. Although Mogren ended up regulated into the second tier, Grbović was offered a trial with Spanish club Valencia. 

After unsuccessful loan spells from Mogren, Grbović joined Sutjeska in 2015. He then moved to Spain and signed with CD Toledo in summer 2016. He played with Toledo the first half of the season at 2016–17 Segunda División B and then was loaned to Rayo Vallecano B and played the second half of season at 2016–17 Tercera División. In summer 2017 he joined Serbian club FK Rad.

International career
Grbović represented Montenegro at U-17,  U-19 and U-21 levels.

References

External links
 

1995 births
Living people
Footballers from Nikšić
Association football wingers
Montenegrin footballers
Montenegro youth international footballers
Montenegro under-21 international footballers
FK Mogren players
FK Sutjeska Nikšić players
CD Toledo players
Rayo Vallecano B players
FK Rad players
FK Kom players
Montenegrin First League players
Segunda División B players
Serbian SuperLiga players
Montenegrin Second League players
Montenegrin expatriate footballers
Expatriate footballers in the Netherlands
Montenegrin expatriate sportspeople in the Netherlands
Expatriate footballers in Spain
Montenegrin expatriate sportspeople in Spain
Expatriate footballers in Serbia
Montenegrin expatriate sportspeople in Serbia